The Blunderer is a psychological thriller by Patricia Highsmith, first published in 1954 by Coward-McCann. It was third of her 22 novels, the second published under her own name.

Synopsis

Mild-mannered lawyer Walter Stackhouse has come to hate his neurotic wife Clara. He has suffered for years as she alienated all his friends and embarrassed him with her pettiness, overly dramatic gestures and intolerance of other people's needs. With Walter, she is increasingly distant and, without foundation, she begins to accuse him of having an affair with the sweet and sensuous music teacher, Ellie Briess.  He does eventually become infatuated with the girl and starts a relationship with her. Jealous Clara then attempts suicide by overdose, forcing Walter back into her arms. However, immediately upon recovering from near-death, Clara falls into her usual pattern; Walter finally stands his ground and demands a divorce. 

Clara is then found dead, having fallen off a cliff during a rest interval while taking a bus to see her dying mother. It is likely suicide.  In time, as the official investigation continues, he has to admit to a couple of questionable activities - stalking Clara's bus in his car, while daydreaming about possibly killing her at the first stop (just as Melchior J. Kimmel, a 40-year old bookshop manager, murdered his own domineering wife Helen, an unsolved crime about which Walter had read in the newspaper and grown fascinated by), and visiting Kimmel prior to Clara's death, which ultimately begins to make him look like he was seeking some how-to advice from a wife-murderer. 

Both Stackhouse and Kimmel soon encounter the formidable, possibly psychotic Lieutenant Lawrence Corby, a police officer with savage ambition who is convinced they are both guilty. Corby soon begins encroaching on his suspects' lives, releasing details of their behavior to the press in an effort to distance them from their friends and work associates and repeatedly assaulting Kimmel. 

Throughout, Walter's blundering damages his relationships, his reputation and soon threatens his life.

Reception
In The New York Times, Anthony Boucher recognized the novel's similarity to Strangers on a Train in its "striking plot idea", which is "so complex that it defies brief synopsis". He continued:

Film adaptations
 Enough Rope (1963, French-language title: Le Meurtrier), a French film directed by Claude Autant-Lara
 A Kind of Murder (2016), directed by Andy Goddard and starring Patrick Wilson and Jessica Biel

References

External links
 The Blunderer (book details) - ChooseYourHighsmith.com

1954 American novels
Novels by Patricia Highsmith
American novels adapted into films
Coward-McCann books